This is a list of electoral results for the electoral district of Darling Downs in Queensland state elections.

Members for Darling Downs

Election results

Elections in the 2000s

References

Queensland state electoral results by district